Revenge of Black Eagle (Italian: La Vendetta di Aquila Nera, released in UK as Revenge of the Black Eagle) is a 1951 Italian adventure film directed by Riccardo Freda. It is a sequel to Freda's 1946 film Black Eagle.

Cast
 Rossano Brazzi as Vladimir Dubrovskij
 Gianna Maria Canale as Tatiana Cernicevskij
 Nerio Bernardi as the Zar
 Franca Marzi as Katia
 Vittorio Sanipoli	as Prince Boris Yuravleff

Release
Revenge of Black Eagle was released in Italy on October 25, 1951 where it was distributed by Associati Produttori Indipendenti (A.P.I.). It grossed a total of 368.15 million Italian lire domestically. The film was released as Revenge of the Black Eagle in the United Kingdom and The Vengeance of the Black Eagle in the United States.

References

Footnotes

Sources

External links
 

1951 films
1950s historical films
Italian historical films
1950s Italian-language films
Films directed by Riccardo Freda
Italian sequel films
Films set in Russia
Films set in the 19th century
Films based on works by Aleksandr Pushkin
Films scored by Renzo Rossellini
Italian black-and-white films
1950s Italian films